The Strangler of Blackmoor Castle is a 1963 West German thriller film directed by Harald Reinl and starring Karin Dor, Harry Riebauer and Rudolf Fernau. It was based on a novel by Bryan Edgar Wallace and was part of a trend of English-set thrillers inspired by Rialto Film's series of adaptations of his father Edgar Wallace's work.

It was shot at the Spandau Studios in Berlin. The film's sets were designed by the art director Werner Achmann.

Cast

References

Bibliography

External links 
 

1963 films
1960s thriller films
German thriller films
West German films
1960s German-language films
Films directed by Harald Reinl
Films set in England
Films set in London
Gloria Film films
Films based on British novels
Films shot at Spandau Studios
1960s German films